"Escape-ism" is a funk song by American musician James Brown. It was Brown's first release on his own label, People Records. It charted #6 R&B and #35 Pop as a two-part single in 1971. Both parts also appeared on the album Hot Pants in 1971, with the previously unreleased nineteen-minute unedited take of the track appearing on the album's 1992 CD re-release. According to Robert Christgau the song was "supposedly cut to kill time until Bobby Byrd arrived" at the studio.

A live version of "Escape-ism" is included on Brown's live album Revolution of the Mind.

References

James Brown songs
Songs written by James Brown
1971 singles
1970 songs